CJNR was a former radio station which operated at 730 kHz in Blind River, Ontario, Canada.

History
In late 1957 Thomas C. Nash (owner of Nash Radio & TV Broadcasting Co.) received a licence for an AM station at Blind River, which began operating at 730 kHz on March 1, 1958. CJNR would have its transmitter in Blind River, along with studios located in Elliot Lake.

In the 1960s or early 1970s the owner of CKNR Elliot Lake purchased CJNR. It would become a semi-satellite of CKNR which began broadcasting in 1967. The owner was or would be known as Algonquin Radio-TV Ltd. (CKCY Sault Ste. Marie).

In the mid-1980s Mid-Canada Communications was approved by the CRTC to acquire CJNR from Huron Broadcasting Limited.

In 1986 CJNR received approval to disaffiliate from the CBC radio network, which is now served by CBCE-FM out of Little Current. In 1990, the Pelmorex Radio Network received approval to acquire CJNR from Mid-Canada Communications.  In 1996, CJNR and its sister stations CKNR and CKNS were sold to North Channel Broadcasters, which established the contemporary CKNR-FM and shut down all three AM signals.

References

External links
 

JNR
Jnr
Radio stations established in 1957
1957 establishments in Ontario
1996_disestablishments_in_Ontario 
Radio_stations_disestablished_in_1996
JNR (AM)